HD 4208 is a star in the southern constellation of Sculptor. It has a yellow hue with an apparent visual magnitude of 7.78, making it too dim to be visible to the naked eye. But with binoculars or small telescope it should be an easy target. This object is located at a distance of 111.6 light years from the Sun based on parallax, and is drifting further away with a radial velocity of +57 km/s.

The star HD 4208 is named Cocibolca. The name was selected in the NameExoWorlds campaign by Nicaragua, during the 100th anniversary of the IAU. Cocibolca is the Nahuatl name for the Lake Nicaragua.

It is roughly 6.6 billion years old and is spinning with a projected rotational velocity of 4.4 km/s. The star has 86% of the Sun's mass and radius, and is radiating 71% of the Sun's luminosity from its photosphere at an effective temperature of 5,717 K.

In 2001, a planet was discovered orbiting the star by means of the radial velocity method. The position of this planet near the star's habitable zone means that it will have a strong gravitational perturbation effect on any potential Earth-mass planet that may be orbiting within this region.

See also
 HD 4203
 HD 4308
 List of extrasolar planets

References

G-type main-sequence stars
Planetary systems with one confirmed planet
Sculptor (constellation)
Durchmusterung objects
9024
004208
003479